Luisa Ionela Luca (born 22 August 1988), known professionally as Minelli, is a Romanian singer and songwriter. Upon being part of the girl group Wassabi from 2006 to 2009, she rose to fame with her 2019 single "Mariola", which topped the Romanian Airplay 100 chart. Subsequently, in 2021, "Rampampam" became a hit in multiple territories.

Life and career
Minelli was born as Luisa Ionela Luca on 22 August 1988, and began singing at the age of 11, when she formed a band in her hometown. In 2004, she moved to Bucharest, and between 2006 and 2009, she was a member of the band Wassabi. They attempted to represent Romania at the Eurovision Song Contest in 2007, submitting the songs "Crazy" with Morandi and "Do the Tango with Me" to that year's national final. After Wassabi disbanded, Minelli focused on her solo career and began working as a singer and songwriter.

In 2019, Minelli released her first number-one single in Romania, "Mariola", which topped the country's Airplay 100 ranking. 2021's "Rampampam" became a hit multiple regions such as Bulgaria, the Czech Republic, Hungary, the Commonwealth of Independent States (CIS), Lithuania and Poland. For the week ending 28 August 2021, "Rampampam" reached number 139 on the Billboard Global Excl. U.S. As a songwriter, Minelli's repertoire includes songs such as "Inimi de ceară" (2017) performed by Andra, "Touch Me" (2019) by Antonia and "Flashbacks" (2021) by Inna.

Personal life 
Minelli met Lucian Luca in 2007 at a recording studio, and the two later married. In 2010, they became parents when Sarah Maria, their first child, was born. In 2017, Minelli gave birth to her second child, a boy named Filip.

Discography

Extended plays

Singles

As lead artist

As featured artist

Uncredited vocals

Promotional singles

Guest appearances

Songwriting credits

References

External links 

 

1988 births
People from Slobozia
21st-century Romanian singers
21st-century Romanian women singers
Romanian dance musicians
Romanian women pop singers
Romanian women singers
Global Records artists
English-language singers from Romania
Living people